Poçan is a Turkish surname. Notable people with the surname include:

 Burçak Özoğlu Poçan (born 1970), Turkish mountain climber
 Mark Pocan (born 1964), American politician
 Serhan Poçan (born 1970), Turkish mountaineer

Turkish-language surnames